Caterina Magdalena Giuseppa Cavalieri (11 March 1755 – 30 June 1801) was an Austrian soprano.

Born as Katharina Magdalena Josepha Cavalier in Lichtental, Vienna, Cavalieri studied voice with composer Antonio Salieri. Her stage debut was in 1775 in Pasquale Anfossi's opera La finta giardiniera. This was followed by Ignaz Umlauf's Singspiel Die Bergknappen in 1778 and the role of Fräule Nannette in Salieri's Der Rauchfangkehrer on 30 April 1781, a role specifically written for her to display her virtuosity. Similarly, Mozart wrote the role of Konstanze in his Singspiel Die Entführung aus dem Serail for her, which she premiered on 16 July 1782. On 1 June 1785 she sang the role of Enrichetta in the première of Stephen Storace's Gli sposi malcontenti. On 7 May 1788, Cavalieri sang the role of Donna Elvira in the Vienna première of Mozart's Don Giovanni. Other works by Mozart written for her are Davide penitente (1785) and the role of Mademoiselle Silberklang in Der Schauspieldirektor (1786).

After 1790, Cavalieri gradually withdrew from the stage and retired on 1 March 1793. She died unmarried in Vienna in 1801, aged 46.

Cavalieri is a nonspeaking role in Peter Shaffer's play Amadeus. The speaking role of Cavalieri in the 1984 Oscar-winning film based on that play is played by Christine Ebersole and sung by Suzanne Murphy. In the film, it is suggested that Cavalieri and Mozart had an affair during the rehearsals of Die Entführung aus dem Serail.

Notes

1755 births
1801 deaths
Musicians from Vienna
Austrian sopranos
Wolfgang Amadeus Mozart's singers
18th-century Austrian women opera singers